The 2014–15 Scottish League Cup was the 69th season of Scotland's second-most prestigious football knockout competition. It is also known as The Scottish League Cup presented by QTS for sponsorship reasons.

Celtic won the cup after a 2–0 win against Dundee United in the final.

Format
The competition was a single elimination knock-out competition. In each round, fixtures are determined by random draw, with the first to third rounds seeded according to last season's league positions (higher 50% of finishers drawn v lower 50% of finishers, alternating which is at home with each tie drawn).

Fixtures are played to a finish, with extra time and then penalties used in the event of draws. The competition is open to all clubs in the Scottish Professional Football League. Clubs involved in European competitions are given a bye to the third round to avoid congestion of fixtures. Celtic, Motherwell, Aberdeen and St Johnstone are the teams that will enter the third round.

Fixtures and results

First round

The first round draw took place on Thursday 10 July 2014 at 2pm BST at the Bet Butler Stadium. The 30 clubs that participated in the Championship, League One and League Two in the 2013–14 season entered the competition at this stage. The 12 clubs that participated in the 2013–14 Scottish Premiership received a bye.

Source: http://spfl.co.uk/league-cup/

Second round

The second round draw took place on Wednesday 6 August 2014 at 6:30pm BST at Murrayfield Stadium. The 8 clubs that participated in the Scottish Premiership in the 2013–14 season but didn't qualify for Europe entered the competition at this stage except Dundee United the highest placed non-Europe qualifying side.

Source: http://spfl.co.uk/league-cup

Third round

The third round draw took place on Wednesday 27 August 2014 at 1pm BST at Pittodrie Stadium. The 4 clubs that participated in the Scottish Premiership in the 2013–14 season and qualified for European competition entered the competition at this stage along with Dundee United the highest placed non-Europe qualifying side.

Source: http://spfl.co.uk/league-cup

Quarter-final
The quarter-final draw took place on Wednesday 24 September 2014 at Tannadice Park following the 3rd round matches.

Semi-final

The semi-final draw took place on Saturday 1 November at 5:05pm live on BBC One Scotland.

Final

References

External links
 Scottish Professional Football League – League Cup official website

Scottish League Cup seasons
League Cup
2014–15 in Scottish football cups